Jerry Sonnenberg (born May 1958) is an American farmer and politician. He served in the Colorado Senate from the 1st district as a member of the Republican Party. During his tenure in the state senate he served as the President pro tempore. Prior to his tenure in the state senate he served in the Colorado House of Representatives from the 65th district.

Sonnenberg was born in Sterling, Colorado, and was educated at Sterling High School and Northeastern Junior College. He started farming in 1979, worked as a cattle rancher, and served on the board of the Colorado Farm Bureau. He managed one of Representative Don Ament's campaigns and served as a precinct chair in Logan County, Colorado. He was elected to the state house in the 2006 election and served until he was elected to the state senate in the 2014 election.

Early life and education

Jerry Sonnenberg was born in Sterling, Colorado, and graduated from Sterling High School and Northeastern Junior College. He started farming his family's 7,000 acre farm in 1979, and worked as a cattle rancher, but had to sell his herd of sixty cattle due to a drought in 2002. He married Vonnie Constance, with whom he had four children.

He served on the board of the Colorado Farm Bureau and was later the only farmer in the Colorado House of Representatives. He managed one of Representative Don Ament's campaigns. He served as a precinct chair for the Republican Party in Logan County, Colorado.

Colorado General Assembly

Sonnenberg won the Republican nomination and was elected to the Colorado House of Representatives from the 65th district without opposition in the 2006 election. He won reelection in the 2008 election against Dan Conn's write-in candidacy. He faced no opposition in the 2010 and 2012 elections. Sonnenberg and Jon Becker were redistricted into the same district for the 2012 election, but Becker chose to not seek reelection. He defeated American Constitution Party nominee Doug Aden for a seat in the Colorado Senate from the 1st district. He defeated Democratic nominee Debra Gustafson in the 2018 election.

During his tenure in the state house he served on the Agriculture, Livestock and Natural Resources committee. Sonnenberg served as the vice-chair of the Veterans and Military Affairs committee and as the chair of the Agriculture, Natural Resources, and Energy committee in the state senate. On November 10, 2016, he was selected to serve as the President pro tempore of the Senate.

Sonnenberg supported Donald Trump during the 2016 presidential election.

Political positions

Sonnenberg supported Initiative 31 in the 2022 election which would reduce the income tax rate from 4.63% to 4.55%. He opposed repealing the death penalty stating that "I believe that the Bible tells me the direction that I need to go, and why the death penalty is important to society." He voted against allowing civil unions for same-sex couples. He received a F rating from NARAL Pro-Choice America. His scores from the American Civil Liberties Union ranged from 44% in 2013, 28.6% in 2014, 60% in 2015, 33.3% in 2016, 66.6% in 2017, 20% in 2018, and 0% in 2019.

Electoral history

References

External links
 Legislative website
 Campaign site

1958 births
21st-century American politicians
Republican Party Colorado state senators
Living people
Republican Party members of the Colorado House of Representatives
People from Sterling, Colorado